The 1928–29 Lancashire Cup was the 21st running of this regional rugby league competition.  Wigan took the trophy for the 6th time, by beating Widnes by 5–4 in the final played at Wilderspool, Warrington.  The attendance was 19,000 and receipts £1,150.

Background 
The number of teams entering this year's competition remained at 13 which resulted in 3 byes in the first round.

Competition and results

Round 1  
Involved  5 matches (with three byes) and 13 clubs

Round 2 – quarterfinals

Round 3 – semifinals

Final

Teams and scorers 

Scoring - Try = three (3) points - Goal = two (2) points - Drop goal = two (2) points

The road to success

See also 
1928–29 Northern Rugby Football League season

Notes 
 1 This match was transferred to the neighbouring St Helens stadium due to the better facilities offered
 2 The official Warrington archives give the score for the replayed match as 13-3 - the details given by "RUGBY LEAGUE projects" show the score as 10-2
 3 Watersheddings was the home ground of Oldham RLFC from 1889 to 1997

References

RFL Lancashire Cup
Lancashire Cup